Kaneko (written: , ,  or  in katakana) is a Japanese surname. Notable people with the surname include:

, Japanese gymnast
, Japanese manga artist
, Japanese baseball player
, Japanese Buddhist philosopher
, Japanese footballer
, Japanese politician
, Japanese anarchist and nihilist
, Japanese politician
, Japanese jurist
, Japanese cyclist
, Japanese footballer
, Japanese classical composer
, Japanese samurai
, Japanese politician, finance minister 1978-79
, Japanese ceramic artist living in the United States
Jutok Kaneko (1958–2007), Japanese musician
, Japanese video game artist and designer
, Japanese politician
, Japanese diplomat
, Japanese baseball player
, Japanese painter, illustrator and photographer
Makoto Kaneko (disambiguation), multiple people
, Japanese karateka and mixed martial artist
, Japanese sport wrestler
, Japanese footballer
, Japanese swimmer
, Japanese Marxian economist
, Japanese politician
, Japanese poet and songwriter
, Japanese poet and painter
, Japanese decathlete
, Japanese actor
, Japanese drummer and actor
, Japanese actor
Ree Kaneko (born 1946), American artist
, Japanese gravure idol, model and singer
, Japanese critic and historian of photography
, Japanese footballer
, Japanese samurai
, Japanese boxer
, Japanese footballer
, Japanese discus thrower
, Japanese footballer
, Japanese screenwriter and film director
, Japanese World War II flying ace
, Japanese actor
, Japanese baseball player
, Japanese footballer
, Japanese writer
, Japanese footballer
, ex-soldier of the Imperial Japanese Army, known for his extensive war crimes testimony
, Japanese golfer
, Japanese general
, Japanese baseball player
, Japanese voice actress
, Japanese footballer
, Japanese badminton player
, Japanese ski jumper
, Japanese footballer
, Japanese sport wrestler
, Japanese politician
, Japanese software programmer, developer of Winny file-sharing program

Fictional characters
Show Kaneko, a character in the manga series Inubaka

See also
Josephine Conger-Kaneko, American journalist and writer
Kaneko Station, a railway station in Iruma, Saitama Prefecture, Japan
4717 Kaneko, a main-belt asteroid

Japanese-language surnames